The 2002–03 Regionalliga season was the ninth season of the Regionalliga at tier three (III) of the German football league system.

The Regionalliga was split into two divisions, the Regionalliga Nord and the Regionalliga Süd. The league champions, Erzgebirge Aue and SpVgg Unterhaching, and the runners-up in both divisions, VfL Osnabrück and Jahn Regensburg, were promoted to the 2003–04 2. Bundesliga.

Teams
SV Babelsberg 03, 1. FC Saarbrücken, 1. FC Schweinfurt 05 and SpVgg Unterhaching came down from the 2001–02 2. Bundesliga, replacing VfB Lübeck, Eintracht Braunschweig, Wacker Burghausen and Eintracht Trier.

Borussia Dortmund (A), Dynamo Dresden, Hamburger SV (A), 1. FC Köln (A), FC Augsburg, Eintracht Frankfurt (A)  Borussia Neunkirchen and SC Pfullendorf were promoted from the Oberliga, replacing 1. FC Magdeburg, Fortuna Düsseldorf, Fortuna Köln, VfR Mannheim, VfB Stuttgart (A), SpVgg Ansbach and Borussia Fulda.

Regionalliga Nord

Final table

Top scorers

Regionalliga Süd
Five teams were due to be relegated, but Stuttgarter Kickers and Sportfreunde Siegen were reprieved because two of the relegated teams from the 2. Bundesliga, SSV Reutlingen and SV Waldhof Mannheim, could not achieve a Regionalliga license, and dropped another level, to the Oberliga.

Final table

Top scorers

References

External links
 Regionalliga at the German Football Association 
 Regionalliga Nord 2002–03 at kicker.de
 Regionalliga Süd 2002–03 at kicker.de

Regionalliga seasons
3
Germ